Ted Elliott may refer to:
Ted Elliott (American football) (born 1964), American football player
Ted Elliott (footballer)
Ted Elliott (screenwriter) (born 1961), American screenwriter
Ted Elliott (umpire) (1851 – 1885), Australian cricket player and umpire
Ted Elliott (voice over) (born 1953), British voice over artist and music presenter

See also
Edward Elliott (disambiguation)